Roy C. Padrick (born 4 April 1975), is an American actor and journalist. He was raised in Merritt Island, Florida, before joining the U.S. Navy in 1994 to begin his career in journalism.

Military career 

Padrick has covered some of the Navy's most important events, from the rescue of downed Air Force pilot Capt. Scott O'Grady, to the rescue of thousands of refugees in then-Zaire (now the Democratic Republic of the Congo) in what was called Operation Noble Obelisk. His journalism and photography have been cited as some of the best examples of military journalism. He has won numerous awards for his work, including the Department of Defense Thomas Jefferson Award for Excellence in Journalism (multiple times), and various newspaper and magazine awards. He was honorably discharged from the Navy after 8 years of service in 2002.

Performing Arts 

Padrick began to develop his singing and acting abilities at an early age, and began performing in school and community productions in middle school. His stage debut was in 1989 in the production The Sound of Music. In high school and college, Padrick continued his performances in various roles, including: The Wolf/Prince Charming in Into the Woods; Freddy Einsford Hill in My Fair Lady; The Boatman in Sunday in the Park with George; Porter Milgrim in Deathtrap; and Neville Craven in The Secret Garden.

In December 2009, Padrick was cast in an independent film called Time Served, produced in Florida. The film is currently in post-production and has been submitted for judging at the Melbourne International Film Festival. He plays Roy Dawkins, the lead in the production, which is currently being shopped to studios.

In October 2010, Padrick played an FBI Special Agent in Randy Noojin's play The Knife Trick. His performance received positive reviews, with director Janet Bentley-Hallberg saying, "Roy Padrick has multiple qualities. He's menacing and warm at the same time, a teddy bear and terrifying."

In March 2011, Padrick was awarded the role of Iago in William Shakespeare's Othello. The play opened May 13, 2011. Padrick played the role of Juror #3 in the stage version of 12 Angry Men in January 2012. His starring performance resulted in the highest ticket sales for non-musicals in years at the Titusville Playhouse.

Personal life 

He has four children and was married to his second wife, on August 15, 2010. She has four children, together they have seven boys and one girl. They currently live in Titusville, Florida.

References

External links
Department of Defense Thomas Jefferson Awards page

1975 births
Living people
People from Merritt Island, Florida
Male actors from Florida